Japanese football in 1950.

Emperor's Cup

Births
April 8 - Nobuo Fujishima
April 14 - Mitsuru Komaeda
May 22 - Michio Ashikaga
September 11 - Eijun Kiyokumo
October 24 - Kozo Arai
November 19 - Keizo Imai
November 28 - George Yonashiro
December 1 - Seiichi Sakiya
December 30 - Kazuhisa Kono

External links

 
Seasons in Japanese football